Tuval is a kibbutz in northern Israel. Located in the Galilee near Karmiel, it falls under the jurisdiction of Misgav Regional Council.

History
The village was founded in 1980 by Scouts and Habonim Dror members from England and South Africa and was named after the biblical Tuval, an offspring of Cain (Genesis 4:22).

In 2000 a community neighborhood was set up within the boundaries of Tuval. Today Tuval is both a kibbutz and a community settlement

Notable people
Robbie Gringras, theatre artist

References

External links

English-Jewish culture in Israel
Kibbutzim
Kibbutz Movement
Populated places established in 1980
1980 establishments in Israel
Populated places in Northern District (Israel)
South African-Jewish culture in Israel